Interstate 90 (I-90) runs east–west across the northern tier of the US state of Ohio. Much of it is along the Ohio Turnpike, but sections outside the turnpike pass through Cleveland and northeast into Pennsylvania.

The entire free section of I-90 in Ohio is called the "AMVETS Highway". Selected stretches are named for various individuals. In Greater Cleveland, portions of I-90 carry various names, such as the Innerbelt Freeway, Cleveland Memorial Shoreway, Lakeland Freeway, and Euclid Spur.

Route description

In the western half of Ohio, I-90 is jointly signed with the Ohio Turnpike/I-80. The Ohio Turnpike/I-90 connector (designated exit 8A, now exit 142) was built in Lorain County in Amherst Township and Elyria Township in 1975.

From the exit east, I-90/State Route 2 (SR 2) travels east along the south shore of Lake Erie through Cuyahoga County to Downtown Cleveland. SR 2 separates from I-90 at Detroit Road in Rocky River. I-90 crosses the Cuyahoga River via the George V. Voinovich Bridges, which replaced the Innerbelt Bridge in 2013 (westbound) through 2016 (eastbound), into Downtown Cleveland and intersects I-77. The innerbelt continues around Downtown Cleveland to a sharp east turn, nicknamed "Dead Man's Curve" for its frequent crashes. While there are plenty of large signs, flashing lights, and rumble strips alerting motorists to this turn, there have still been a large number of crashes resulting from inattentive motorists. There are plans to realign the freeway along a shallower curve within the next decade, as part of a larger project to improve the highway system in Cleveland.

I-90 then follows the East Shoreway northeastward along the lakeshore toward Euclid, again cosigned with SR 2. I-90 separates from SR 2 in Euclid and passes through Lake County and Ashtabula County as it continues to travel northeast towards the Pennsylvania state line in Conneaut.

US Route 20 (US 20) parallels I-90 throughout Ohio, as it does in all locations from Illinois eastward; US 6 also parallels I-90 to a lesser extent throughout the state. East of I-271, SR 84 and SR 307 also closely parallel I-90. These routes are usually easily accessible from I-90's interchanges.

History

The very first portion of I-90 in Ohio was built in 1935. This portion was a part of the Cleveland Memorial Shoreway, running from East 9th Street to East 55th Street. The year 1938 saw the addition of an eastward expansion to the Illuminating Company plant, which was within close proximity of Gordon Park. The interchange with East 9th Street was completed in 1940. 1941 saw an addition of the freeway, running between the former terminus at Gordon Park, to East 140th Street in Euclid. The westernmost part of I-90 in Ohio was built from 1952 to 1955, with the construction of the Ohio Turnpike. The Innerbelt Freeway was built in 1959 and was the main freeway that ran through Cleveland. I-90 opened between SR 528 in Madison and SR 7 in Conneaut on December 15, 1959, and between SR 44 in Concord Township and SR 528 in Madison on June 30, 1960. A part of I-90 running from East 140th Street to the Lakeland Freeway split was built in 1962, with the construction of the Lakeland Freeway. The part connecting the Lakeland Freeway and I-271 was built in the mid-1960s. From the mid-1960s to 1978, the part of I-90 running from the Ohio Turnpike in Lorain County to the interchange with I-71 and what is now I-490 was built. The final section of that part of the road opened on November 4 of that year.

The Innerbelt in Cleveland previously used a steel-gusset bridge of the same design as the I-35W Mississippi River bridge that failed in Minneapolis, Minnesota, in 2007. Construction of a new crossing, the George V. Voinovich Bridges, began in 2011. It includes two parallel bridges, one for each direction of traffic; the westbound bridge opened in 2013, while the eastbound bridge opened in 2016 on the site of the Innerbelt Bridge.

Exit list

Related highways

See also

 Interstate 90 Grand River bridges

Notes

References

External links

 Ohio
90
Transportation in Williams County, Ohio
Transportation in Fulton County, Ohio
Transportation in Lucas County, Ohio
Transportation in Wood County, Ohio
Transportation in Ottawa County, Ohio
Transportation in Sandusky County, Ohio
Transportation in Erie County, Ohio
Transportation in Lorain County, Ohio
Transportation in Cuyahoga County, Ohio
Transportation in Lake County, Ohio
Transportation in Ashtabula County, Ohio